= The Illustrated Guide to the Elements =

The Illustrated Guide to the Elements is a book by Jenna Whyte. Published in 2012, the book features factual information about all the chemical elements with drawings to illustrate the information. There was mention of a sequel.
